The 2018 Men's Pan-American Volleyball Cup was the 13th edition of the annual men's volleyball tournament. It was held in Córdoba, Veracruz, Mexico from 28 August to 2 September. Twelve teams competed and the top five ranked teams at the end of the tournament will be qualified to the 2019 Pan American Games in Lima, Peru.

Argentina won the second straight title after defeating Brazil 3–2 in the final. Ezequiel Palacios was awarded the Most Valuable Player.

Pools composition

Pool standing procedure
 Number of matches won
 Match points
 Points ratio
 Sets ratio
 Result of the last match between the tied teams

Match won 3–0: 5 match points for the winner, 0 match points for the loser
Match won 3–1: 4 match points for the winner, 1 match point for the loser
Match won 3–2: 3 match points for the winner, 2 match points for the loser

Preliminary round
All times are Central Daylight Time (UTC−06:00).

Group A

Group B

Group C

Final round

Championship bracket

7th–10th places bracket

11th place match

Classification 7th–10th

Quarterfinals

9th place match

7th place match

Semifinals

5th place match

3rd place match

Final

Final standing

Individual awards

Most Valuable Player
  Ezequiel Palacios
Best Setter
  Matías Sánchez
Best Outside Hitters
  Ezequiel Palacios
  Miguel Ángel López
Best Middle Blockers
  Flávio Gualberto
  Roamy Alonso
Best Opposite
  Alan Souza
Best Scorer
  Alan Souza
Best Server
  David Wieczorek
Best Libero
  Yonder García
Best Digger
  Yonder García
Best Receiver
  Yonder García

References

Men's Pan-American Volleyball Cup
Pan-American Volleyball Cup
International volleyball competitions hosted by Mexico
2018 in Mexican sports
Sport in Veracruz
Pan-American Volleyball Cup
Pan-American Volleyball Cup
Pan-American Volleyball Cup